Adrián Coria (born 23 May 1977) is an Argentine footballer currently playing as a forward for Juventud Unida de Gualeguaychú of the Torneo Argentino B in Argentina.

Honours
Universitario
 Torneo Apertura: 1999

Sources
 

1977 births
Living people
Argentine footballers
Argentine expatriate footballers
Club Universitario de Deportes footballers
Comunicaciones F.C. players
Miramar Misiones players
12 de Octubre Football Club players
C.D. Marathón players
Club Almagro players
San Lorenzo de Almagro footballers
Club Atlético Douglas Haig players
Club Atlético Platense footballers
Gimnasia y Esgrima de Jujuy footballers
Sportivo Desamparados footballers
Expatriate footballers in Peru
Expatriate footballers in Paraguay
Expatriate footballers in Uruguay
Expatriate footballers in Honduras
Expatriate footballers in Guatemala
Association football forwards
Footballers from Buenos Aires